Wild Mountain Thyme is a 2020 romantic comedy-drama film written and directed by John Patrick Shanley, based on his play Outside Mullingar. The film stars Emily Blunt, Jamie Dornan, Jon Hamm, Dearbhla Molloy and Christopher Walken.

Wild Mountain Thyme was released in the United States on 11 December 2020, by Bleecker Street, and in the United Kingdom on 30 April 2021, by Lionsgate via PVOD.

Plot
In County Mayo, Ireland, two introverted misfits in their late 30s have lived in adjacent farms their whole lives. Rosemary Muldoon (Emily Blunt) is in love with Anthony Reilly (Jamie Dornan), but he fails to show interest.

In a flashback to their childhood, Anthony smells a flower and gets pollen on his nose. A girl laughs at Anthony, and Rosemary pushes her in anger. Anthony, in turn, pushes Rosemary down. Seeing that she is upset, Rosemary's father plays the score to the ballet Swan Lake and tells her she is the white swan.

In the present, Anthony's father Tony (Christopher Walken) claims his son is not sane. Anthony hears a voice in the fields that tells him "Go," though he does not reveal to where. Tony plans to disinherit Anthony, as he fears his misanthropic son will not marry and have children, leading to the end of the Reilly legacy. He considers selling the farm to his nephew Adam (Jon Hamm), who is New York City banker. Determined to inherit the farm, Anthony plans to propose to Rosemary with his late mother's ring, however he loses it outdoors. He uses a metal detector to search for the ring in his free time.

At Tony's 75th birthday party, Adam arrives and flirts with Rosemary. She likes that Adam is direct and extroverted. He asks her to visit him in New York.

Rosemary's mother falls ill and dies. Tony decides to not sell to Adam, as it would ruin any chance of Anthony and Rosemary getting together. Not long after, Tony is on his death bed. He apologizes to Anthony for almost selling the farm, and they reconcile. Tony dies that night.

Rosemary and Anthony now live alone. She tries to get closer to him, but he pushes her away and suggests she leave Ireland altogether. Rosemary flies to New York to visit Adam. They attend a performance of Swan Lake and have dinner. Adam suggests Rosemary's longing for Anthony is making her miserable. She resists giving up hope.

After returning home, Rosemary finds Anthony on her property with his metal detector. She invites him to her house, where they fight about his difficulty accepting love. Anthony confesses a secret that ruined past relationships: he believes he is a honeybee. Rosemary reveals that she found Anthony's ring, and he finally proposes. He tells her the voice in the fields has been instructing him to go to her all along.

In the local pub, the two sing "Wild Mountain Thyme", and everyone (including their deceased parents) sings along.

Cast
 Emily Blunt as Rosemary Muldoon
 Abigail Coburn as young Rosemary Muldoon
 Jamie Dornan as Anthony Reilly
 Darragh O'Kane as young Anthony Reilly
 Jon Hamm as Adam Kelly
 Christopher Walken as Tony Reilly
 Dearbhla Molloy as Aoife Muldoon
 Don Wycherley as Chris Muldoon
 Danielle Ryan as Maeve
 Barry McGovern as Cleary
 Lydia McGuinness as Eleanor

Production
It was announced in May 2019 that John Patrick Shanley would write and direct an adaptation of his play Outside Mullingar, starring Jamie Dornan and Holliday Grainger By August, Emily Blunt, Jon Hamm, Christopher Walken and Dearbhla Molloy were added to the cast, with Blunt replacing Grainger in her role, and Molloy reprising her role from the play.

Locations

Filming began in Crossmolina, County Mayo, Ireland on 30 September 2019. It continued in Ballina, County Mayo and lasted over five weeks. Mount Nephin was prominently displayed in the film.

Release
It was released in the United States on 11 December 2020. The trailer was released on 10 November 2020, and was criticized for its inaccurate Irish accents and  rehashing of hackneyed stereotypes. Shanley stated that no one would understand the characters if they sounded like his relatives spoke, and "you have to make the accent more accessible to a global audience".

It was the eighth-most rented film on FandangoNow in its debut weekend.

The film was released on DVD on 2 February 2021 with no Blu-ray or 4K UHD format.

Soundtrack 
The soundtrack album was released digitally in December 2020, featuring Amelia Warner's score and an original song by Sinéad O'Connor.

Reception 
The website's critics consensus reads: "Fatally undermined by dodgy accents and a questionable story, Wild Mountain Thyme is a baffling misfire for a talented filmmaker and impressive cast." On Metacritic, it has a weighted average score of 45 out of 100 based on reviews from 24 critics, indicating "mixed or average reviews".

David Ehrlich of IndieWire gave the film a "C−" and wrote: "Shanley, whose script for Moonstruck suggests that he once had a slightly tighter handle on this sort of thing, brings his play 'Outside Mullingar' to the screen like he's trying to fill every close-up with enough whimsical enchantment to reach the back row of a Broadway theater. The lethal intensity of this effect cannot be overstated; the only logical explanation for what happened here is that someone planted a bomb in Shanley's editing bay and timed it to explode if any cut of Wild Mountain Thyme dipped below 50 kilohertz of cartoon Irish charm per minute." Kevin Maher, chief film critic of The Times, described the film's representation of Ireland anti-Irish, calling it "representational fascism".

Mick LaSalle of the San Francisco Chronicle gave the film a positive review: "The gentle spirit of Wild Mountain Thyme envelops us early, to the extent that, midway through, even though there is very little left to resolve, we are in its spell." The Patricia Danaher of the Irish Independent, while critical of the accents, thought it was "actually quite good" and "worth a watch". Donald Clarke of The Irish Times gave it 1 out of 5 and said "the accents certainly aren't so bad as many have suggested. But this is still stunningly regressive stuff."

The reveal that Anthony considers himself a bee was also ridiculed for its strangeness. Karen Han of Slate drew comparisons between the protagonists' identities and that of furries. Han additionally wondered if John Patrick Shanley intended to portray the characters as otherkin.

References

External links
 

2020 films
2020 romantic comedy-drama films
2020s English-language films
2020s American films
2020s British films
American films based on plays
American romantic comedy-drama films
Bleecker Street films
British films based on plays
British romantic comedy-drama films
English-language Irish films
Films about families
Films about farmers
Films set on farms
Films directed by John Patrick Shanley
Films set in Ireland
Films set in New York City
Films shot in the Republic of Ireland
Films with screenplays by John Patrick Shanley
HanWay Films films
Irish films based on plays
Irish romantic comedy-drama films
Lionsgate films